This is a list of British Brigades in the Second World War. It is intended as a central place to access resources about formations of brigade size that served in the British Army during the Second World War.

 List of British airborne brigades of the Second World War (includes airlanding and parachute brigades)
 List of British anti-aircraft brigades of the Second World War
 List of British infantry brigades of the Second World War (1–100)
 List of British infantry brigades of the Second World War (101–308 and named)
 List of British mobile brigades during the Second World War (includes armoured, cavalry, armoured reconnaissance, motor machine gun, support groups, and tank brigades)
 List of British special service brigades of the Second World War

See also 
 British Army during the Second World War
 British deception formations in World War II
 British infantry brigades of the First World War
 Military history of Britain during World War II

Lists of military units and formations of World War II
 
Brigades, World War II
Brigades